The enzyme L-3-cyanoalanine synthase (EC 4.4.1.9) catalyzes the chemical reaction

L-cysteine + hydrogen cyanide  L-3-cyanoalanine + hydrogen sulfide

This enzyme belongs to the family of lyases, specifically the class of carbon-sulfur lyases.  The systematic name of this enzyme class is L-cysteine hydrogen-sulfide-lyase (adding hydrogen cyanide L-3-cyanoalanine-forming). Other names in common use include β-cyanoalanine synthase, β-cyanoalanine synthetase, β-cyano-L-alanine synthase, and L-cysteine hydrogen-sulfide-lyase (adding HCN).  This enzyme participates in cyanoamino acid metabolism.

References

 
 
 
 

EC 4.4.1
Enzymes of unknown structure